Juan Pablo Camacho Martino  (born 21 November 1984) is the first Chilean born in the Antarctic Region and the ninth person born south of the 60 parallel. He was born in Villa Las Estrellas at the Presidente Eduardo Frei Montalva Base in King George Island.

His parents were sent there to conceive and give birth to a child in order to strengthen Chile's claim on Antarctica.

See also
 Demographics of Antarctica

References

1984 births
Living people
People from Chilean Antartica